Alfred Auguste Nemours (13 July 1883 – 17 October 1955) was a Haitian General, diplomat and military historian.

Biography
He was born into a wealthy family in Cap-Haïtien, northern Haiti. His father was Nemours Auguste and his mother Amétise Albaret. He adopted Nemours as his principal name later in life.
Alfred was sent to the Lycée in Paris, followed by the military academy Saint-Cyr.

During the United States occupation of Haiti, Auguste Nemours wrote his Histoire Militaire. He also was part of the unpopular occupation government of Louis Borno, serving as Conseiller d'Etat from 1918-1922, Secretary and President du Conseil d'Etat from 1922 to 1925, and Minister Plenipotentiary to Paris from 1926 to 1930. From 1928 to 1929 he was concurrently accredited to the Holy See.

He was the Haitian delegate to the 7th (1926), 9th (1928) and 16th (1935) Ordinary Session of the  Assembly of the League of Nations, held in Geneva, Switzerland. Speaking at the League, Nemours made a widely-reproduced statement in response to the invasion of Ethiopia by Mussolini's fascist troops:

He continued to play a prominent role in Haitian politics, as Senator of the Republic in 1938 and Secretary of State of Interior in 1940. C. L. R. James met Nemours in Paris when he was writing The Black Jacobins (1938).

Publications
 1909: Sur le choix d'une discipline: l'anglo-saxonne ou la française
 1925: Histoire militaire de la guerre d'independance de Saint-Domingue
 1926: Les Borno dans l'histoire d'Haiti
 1927: Princesses créoles (with Claude Farrère)
 1941: Les Premiers citoyens et les premiers députés noirs et de couleur: la loi du 4 avril 1792, ses précédents, sa première application à Saint-Domingue, d'après des documents inédits de l'époque, suivi de : Le Cap Français en 1792, à l'arrivée de Sonthonax, d'après des documents inédits de l'époque
 1945: La Charte des Nations Unies: étude comparative de la Charte avec les propositions de Dumbarton Oaks, le covenant de la Société des Nations, les conventions de la Haye, les propositions et doctrines inter américaines
 1952: Haïti et la Guerre de l'Indépendance Américaine (reprinted 2013)

References

1883 births
1955 deaths
20th-century Haitian historians
Haitian male writers
Haitian diplomats
Haitian military personnel
Ambassadors of Haiti to France
20th-century male writers